Chatsworth station (also known as Chatsworth Transportation Center) is an intermodal passenger transport station in the Los Angeles neighborhood of Chatsworth, California, United States. It is served by Amtrak intercity rail service, Metrolink commuter rail service, Los Angeles Metro Busway bus rapid transit, and several transit bus operators.

It is also the northern terminus of the Metro G Line. The station is also served by Los Angeles Metro Bus and Simi Valley Transit local buses, plus Santa Clarita Transit and LADOT Commuter Express regional express bus routes.

The Southern Pacific Railroad (SP) opened its first Chatsworth station in 1893; SP service ended in the 1950s. Metrolink service began in 1992 with a station near the former SP station site; Amtrak service soon moved there. A station building was completed in 1996, and bus rapid transit service began in 2012.

History 

The Southern Pacific Railroad (SP) opened a  branch line from Burbank to Chatsworth in 1893. The SP extended the branch westward in 1904, eventually forming the Coast Line. The 1893-built station was a typical style: a two-story wooden depot with a longer one-story freight house. It was replaced with a similar larger station in 1910, though was left standing. The original depot burned down in 1917; the newer station was demolished in 1962.

An infill station opened in Chatsworth on the short-lived CalTrain line on December 29, 1982, only to close when service ended on March 2, 1983. On June 26, 1988, Amtrak extended one San Diegan round trip to Santa Barbara, with the ex-CalTrain stop at Chatsworth reused as an intermediate stop.

On October 26, 1992, Metrolink Ventura County Line service began. The Metrolink station – a bare platform with small shelters – was located near the original station site; Amtrak soon moved its operations to the Metrolink station. The Chatsworth Transportation Center, opened in 1996, was designed to echo the appearance of the 1893-built station. The -long structure cost $1.7 million. The station originally had only a single side platform on the east (main) track; a second platform on the west (siding) track was later added.

On June 30, 2012, LA Metro opened a  extension of Orange Line (now the G Line) busway, with Chatsworth as the northern terminus.

Services

Station layout

Connections 
, the following connections are available:
 Amtrak Thruway: 4
 City of Santa Clarita Transit: 791
 LADOT Commuter Express: 
 Simi Valley Transit: C

References

External links 

 TrainWeb USA RailGuide: Chatsworth, CA (CWT)

Railway stations in Los Angeles
Chatsworth, Los Angeles
G Line (Los Angeles Metro)
Amtrak stations in Los Angeles County, California
Los Angeles Metro Busway stations
Metrolink stations in Los Angeles County, California
Transit centers in the United States
Public transportation in the San Fernando Valley
Public transportation in Los Angeles
Railway stations in the United States opened in 1982
Railway stations closed in 1983
Railway stations in the United States opened in 1988
Bus stations in Los Angeles
1982 establishments in California
1983 disestablishments in California
1988 establishments in California